Catharpin is an unincorporated community in Prince William County, Virginia, in the United States. Catharpin lies on State Route 234 to the northwest of Manassas National Battlefield Park.

Geography
Catharpin is characterized by rolling fields, wide meadows, and gravel/dirt roads, and many of the rural folk capitalize on the abundant land and have farms with livestock.

Notable residents
 Ben Sanders, former MLB pitcher for the Philadelphia Phillies, Philadelphia Athletics, and Louisville Colonels
 Jennie Dean (1848-1913), African American educator and missionary

References

Unincorporated communities in Prince William County, Virginia
Washington metropolitan area
Unincorporated communities in Virginia